Le Vibal is a commune in the Aveyron department in southern France.

Population

See also
Communes of the Aveyron department

References

External links

 Official Web site 
 A bit of History 

Communes of Aveyron
Aveyron communes articles needing translation from French Wikipedia